Pinch marks are a cutaneous condition caused by pinching, and when on the ears or in the genital region of male children may be suggestive of child abuse.

See also 
 Runner's rump
 List of cutaneous conditions

References 

Skin conditions resulting from physical factors